Matteo Viola was the defending champion but decided not to participate.
Leonardo Mayer won the title after defeating Paolo Lorenzi 6–2, 6–4 in the final.

Seeds

Draw

Finals

Top half

Bottom half

References
 Main Draw
 Qualifying Draw

Challenger Ciudad de Guayaquil - Singles
2012 Singles